Northeast Township is one of ten townships in Orange County, Indiana, United States. As of the 2010 census, its population was 549 and it contained 233 housing units.

Geography

Unincorporated towns
 Bromer at 
 Leipsic at 
 Pumpkin Center at 
(This list is based on USGS data and may include former settlements.)

Cemeteries
The township contains these four cemeteries: Edward, Freed, Freedom and Trimble.

Major highways
  Indiana State Road 60

School districts
 Orleans Community Schools

Political districts
 Indiana's 9th congressional district
 State House District 62
 State Senate District 44

References
 
 United States Census Bureau 2008 TIGER/Line Shapefiles
 IndianaMap

External links
 Indiana Township Association
 United Township Association of Indiana
 City-Data.com page for Northeast Township

Townships in Orange County, Indiana
Townships in Indiana